¸

Maša Martinović (married  Vidić, born 9 January 1989 in Čakovec, Croatia) is a  Croatian karate athlete competing in category kumite female +68 kg.

Achievements 
2016
  European Championships – 5–8 May, Montpellier, FRA – kumite +68 kg
 5th place World Championships – 25–30 October, Linz, AUT – kumite +68 kg
2015
  1st European Games – 14 June, Baku, AZE – kumite +68 kg
  European Championships – 19–22 March, Istanbul, TUR – kumite +68 kg
2013
  World Combat Games – 20–21 October, Saint Petersburg, RUS – kumite +68 kg
 Karate 1 Premier League – Grand Winner 2013 – kumite +68 kg
2012
  World University Championships – 13–15 July, Bratislava, SVK – kumite +68 kg
  World Championships – 21–25 November, Paris, FRA – kumite team
  European Championships – 10–13 May, Adeje, ESP – kumite team
2011
  European University Championships – 22–25 July, Sarajevo, BIH – kumite +68 kg
2010
  World Championships – 27–31 October, Belgrade, SRB – kumite team
2008
   European Cadet-Junior Karate Championships – 15–17 February, Trieste, ITA – junior kumite team 
2007
   World Cadet-Junior Karate Championships – 19–21 October, Istanbul, TUR – junior kumite team

References 

Sportspeople from Čakovec
Croatian female karateka
European Games medalists in karate
1989 births
Living people
Sportspeople from Zagreb
Karateka at the 2015 European Games
European Games gold medalists for Croatia
21st-century Croatian women
20th-century Croatian women